Cruising may refer to:

 Cruising, on a cruise ship
Cruising (driving), driving around for social purposes, especially by teenagers
Cruising (maritime), leisurely travel by boat, yacht, or cruise ship
Cruising for sex, the process of searching in public places for sexual partners, especially by gay men
Cruising (film), a 1980 film starring Al Pacino
Cruising (novel), the 1970 novel upon which the 1980 film is based
 Cruising (play), an Australian play by Alexandra Edmondson
 "Cruising" (song), a 1984 pop song by Sinitta
Cruising, a motor milestone for infants where they can walk by holding onto something and they make the transition to being a toddler

See also
 Cruise (disambiguation)
 Cruiser (disambiguation)
 Cruis'n, a 2007 racing game
 Cruisin' (disambiguation)
 Cruz (disambiguation)